Antena Internațional is an international television station, owned by the Intact Media Group,  designated for Romanians that are living outside Romania. It started broadcasting on 1 July 2006. It can be seen only in United States and Canada, where it is available on RSC2, one of the Romanian channels offered by Silviu Prigoanǎ's RomSatNet. A subscription costs US$20 a month before taxes. All the shows that are broadcast simultaneously or reruns of shows already broadcast on Antena 1, Antena Stars, Antena 3 CNN or Happy Channel.

On 28 November 2016, Antena Internațional and other Intact Media channels went to the 16:9 HD format. 

To match with Antena 1, Antena Internațional changed its logo on 31 October 2022. However, the idents will remain the same as in 2016.

External links 
 Official Site

Television channels and stations established in 2006
Television stations in Romania